Gun Gospel is a 1927 American silent Western film directed by Harry Joe Brown and written by Marion Jackson and Don Ryan. It is based on the 1926 novel Gun Gospel by William Dawson Hoffman. The film stars Ken Maynard, Virginia Brown Faire, Romaine Fielding, Bob Fleming, J. P. McGowan and Jerry Madden. The film was released on November 6, 1927, by First National Pictures.

Cast  
 Ken Maynard as Granger Hume
 Virginia Brown Faire as Mary Carrol
 Romaine Fielding as Richard Carrol
 Bob Fleming as 'Dad' Walker
 J. P. McGowan as Bill Brogan
 Jerry Madden as Fielding's Son
 Noah Young as Jack Goodshot
 William J. Dyer as Sheriff 
 Slim Whitaker as Brogan's Henchman 
 Tarzan as Tarzan

References

External links
 

1927 films
1927 Western (genre) films
First National Pictures films
Films directed by Harry Joe Brown
American black-and-white films
Silent American Western (genre) films
1920s English-language films
1920s American films